At least four ships of the Hellenic Navy have borne the name Themistoklis, sometimes rendered as Themistocles, after the ancient Athenian statesman:

  a  launched in 1942 as HMS Bramham and transferred to Greece and renamed in 1943. She was returned to the Royal Navy in 1959 and scrapped in 1960.
  a  launched in 1944 as USS Frank Knox she was transferred to Greece in 1971 and renamed. She was sunk as a target in 2001.
  a  launched in 1961 as USS Berkeley she was transferred to Greece in 1992 and renamed. She was scrapped in 2004.
  an  launched in 1979 as HNLMS Philips van Almonde she was transferred to Greece in 2002 and renamed.

See also
At least two civilian ships called Themistocles:
 , a ship launched as Moraitis in 1907 and renamed Themistocles in 1908
 , a ship launched in 1910 and completed in 1911.

Hellenic Navy ship names